Frenetica is the second studio album by German Latin-pop band Marquess. It was released on June 29, 2007. It spawned two singles: "Vayamos Companeros" and "You and Not Tokio".

Track listing 

 Mañana – 3:35
 Vayamos Compañeros – 3:01
 En España – 3:12
 You and not Tokio (feat. S.A.M.) – 3:38
 No Importa – 3:18
 El Temperamento (Spanish Single Version) – 3:20
 La Discoteca – 3:17
 Puerta de la Noche – 4:08
 Radio Increible – 2:59
 Todo bien Mariha (feat. Mariha) – 3:39
 Lo Siento y Adios – 3:49
 Dove ti Porta – 3:48

Year-end charts

Frenetica

"Vayamos Companeros" (single)

References

External links
Marquess Music

Marquess (band) albums
2007 albums